The 2018–19 Tercera División was the fourth tier in Spanish football. It began in August 2018 and ended in late June 2019 with the promotion play-off finals.

Competition format
The top four eligible teams in each group would play the promotion playoffs.
The champion of each group would qualify to 2019–20 Copa del Rey. If the champion is a reserve team, the first non-reserve team qualified would join the Copa.
In each group, at least three teams would be relegated to Regional Divisions.

Controversy in Group 8
After being relegated, Real Burgos sued the Castile and León Football Federation arguing that the postponement of their match in the previous season against Arandina forced them to play three games in seven days with few rounds left, harming their performance and finishing the league in relegation positions.

Initially, they were admitted in Tercera División, in application of the precautionary measures by the Judgement, but later the Royal Spanish Football Federation revoked the decision commenting in a statement that the responsibility of organising the competition is theirs and not of the Regional federation.

Group 1 – Galicia

Teams

League table

Top goalscorers

Group 2 – Asturias

Teams

League table

Top goalscorers

Group 3 – Cantabria

Teams

League table

Top goalscorers

Group 4 – Basque Country

Teams

League table

Top goalscorers

Group 5 – Catalonia

Teams

League table

Top goalscorers

Group 6 – Valencian Community

Teams

League table

Top goalscorers

Group 7 – Community of Madrid

Teams

League table

Top goalscorers

Group 8 – Castile and León

Teams

League table

Top goalscorers

Group 9 – Eastern Andalusia and Melilla

Teams

League table

Top goalscorers

Group 10 – Western Andalusia and Ceuta

Teams

League table

Top goalscorers

Group 11 – Balearic Islands

Teams

League table

Top goalscorers

Group 12 – Canary Islands

Teams

League table

Top goalscorers

Group 13 – Region of Murcia

Teams

League table

Top goalscorers

Group 14 – Extremadura

Teams

League table

Top goalscorers

Group 15 – Navarre

Teams

League table

Top goalscorers

Group 16 – La Rioja

Teams

League table

Group 17 – Aragon

Teams

League table

Group 18 – Castilla-La Mancha

Teams

League table

Play-offs

References

External links
Royal Spanish Football Federation website

 
Tercera División seasons

4
Spain